Hoza'a Sherif (c. 1961 – July 22, 2015) was a Lebanese diplomat who served as Lebanon's Ambassador to Iraq from 2006 until his death in 2015.

Sherif died following a long battle with cancer at the American-Lebanese University Hospital in Beirut on July 22, 2015, at the age of 54. He was buried in his hometown of Yammouna, Lebanon.

References

2015 deaths
Ambassadors of Lebanon to Iraq
Lebanese diplomats
Year of birth uncertain